M'sila (also spelled Msila);  is the capital of M'Sila Province, Algeria, and is co-extensive with M'sila District. It has a population of 132,975 as per the 2008 census.  M'sila University is also located in this city.

History
The city was founded  under the name al-Muhammadiya, named after the second Fatimid caliph, al-Qa'im, during the latter's campaign against the rebellious Berber tribes of central Algeria. Meant to cement Fatimid control over the Hodna plain, the construction of the city was entrusted to Ali ibn Hamdun al-Andalusi, who became its first governor. Much building material for the new city was taken from a nearby ruined Roman city (likely Lambaesis or Timgad).

M'sila was the location of the first village constructed as part of a government-run program to transition nomadic Algerians to sedentary life using local materials. The village, now complete, was dubbed Maader and consists of houses, public and trading areas, and a mosque. Today it is much more developed with many companies, business offices, religious centers and schools.

Climate
M'sila has a cold semi-arid climate (Köppen climate classification BSk). Rainfall is higher in winter than in summer. About  of precipitation falls annually.

Economy
M'sila is primarily known for its farming and small business.

References

External links
Encycloepaedia of the Orient-a brief description of M'Sila, focusing on its capital
BBC - a news article about some recent violence in M'Sila
Archnet - focuses on the Maader village project
Wetlands International - an in-depth description of M'Sila's wetland

Communes of M'Sila Province
Cities in Algeria
Province seats of Algeria
Algeria
920s establishments
Populated places established in the 10th century